Ampem Darkoa Ladies F.C. is a Ghanaian professional women's football club based in Techiman in the Bono East Region of Ghana. The club features in the Ghana Women’s Premier League GWPL). The club was formed in 2009. It was one of the foundational clubs for the maiden GWPL season in 2012–13. It is currently the 2nd most successful women's club in Ghana after winning the Women's League on 2 different occasions against Hasaacas Ladies who have won it 4 times.

History 
In 2009, the club was formed in Techiman, the capital of Techiman Municipal and Bono East Region of Ghana as one of the women's association football clubs in Ghana.

Grounds 
The club plays their home matches at the Nana Ameyaw park in Techiman.

Honours

Domestic 
League titles
 Ghana Women's Premier League

 Winners (3): 2015–16, 2017, 2021–22

 Ghana Women's Super Cup

 Winners (1): 2017

Notable players 
For details on notable Ampem Darkoa Ladies F.C. footballers see Category:Ampem Darkoa Ladies F.C. players.

See also 

 Women's football in Ghana

References

External links 

 Official Website
 Ampem Darkoa on Twitter
 Footy Ghana category about Ampem Darkoa Ladies

2009 establishments in Ghana
Association football clubs established in 2009
Women's football clubs in Ghana